Veronica Fair Sullins (born Veronica Ching Fair; August 5, 1978) is an American retired professional soccer player who represented the United States national team, winning three caps. She played professional club soccer for New York Power and San Diego Spirit of the Women's United Soccer Association (WUSA).

Her twin sister, Lorrie Fair, was also a member of the national team, and when Ronnie was called in to participate in a game against England on May 9, 1997, in San Jose, California, it became the first time a pair of sisters played together for the women's national team.

Playing career
Fair was drafted to the New York Power for the inaugural season of the WUSA. She started all 21 games and served two assists. She returned with the Power for the 2002 season and was the only player on the squad to start all 21 games. She played a total of 1752 minutes as a midfielder and defender during the season. Her four assists ranked second on the team. During the 2003 season, Fair played for the San Diego Spirit.

International career
In 1997, Fair made two substitute appearances for the senior United States women's team. She started a match in 1998 for a total of three caps.

Current career 
Dr. Veronica Fair Sullins graduated from medical school at the University of California, San Diego in 2009. She completed her residency at Harbor–UCLA Medical Center in general surgery. Sullins then matched in a highly competitive pediatric surgery program at Children's Hospital of Wisconsin. She is now a pediatric surgeon at Mattel Children's Hospital at UCLA.

References

External links
 San Diego Spirit player profile
 Stanford player profile

1978 births
Living people
United States women's international soccer players
American sportspeople of Chinese descent
San Diego Spirit players
Women's United Soccer Association players
New York Power players
Stanford Cardinal women's soccer players
American women's soccer players
Women's association football defenders
American sportswomen of Chinese descent
Twin sportspeople
American twins